Hariana (Hindi: हरियाना) or haryanvi is an Indian breed of cow  native to North India, specially in the state of Haryana. They produce about 10 to 15 litres of milk a day, compared to 8.9 litres when cross-bred with Holstein Friesian cattle (HS), whereas pure HS can produce 50 litres a day, but it is not as disease-resistant in the conditions of North India.

Range
The breed is native to Rohtak, Karnal, Kurukshetra, Jind, Hissar, and Gurugram districts in the state of Haryana. The cattle are of medium to large size, and are generally of white to gray shades in color.

Features
Horns are short and the face is narrow and long. The cows are fairly good milk yielders, and bulls are good at work. It is an important dual-purpose, milk and draught, cattle breed of India.

Origin
The Hariana breed, found in Haryana and eastern Punjab, is one of the 75 known breeds of zebu (Bos indicus).

Zebu is split about evenly between African and South Asian breeds. Zebu cattle are thought to be derived from Asian aurochs, sometimes regarded as a subspecies, Bos primigenius namadicus Wild Asian aurochs disappeared during the time of the Indus Valley civilisation from its range in the Indus River basin and other parts of South Asia possibly due to interbreeding with domestic zebu and resultant fragmentation of wild populations due to loss of habitat.

See also

 Gir cattle
 Jersey cattle
 Government Livestock Farm, Hisar
 List of breeds of cattle
 National Dairy Research Institute, Karnal, 
 Regional Fodder Station, Hisar

References 

Cattle breeds originating in India
Cattle breeds
Animal husbandry in Haryana